Kelley Massif is a rugged mountain massif,  long, located immediately west of the Eland Mountains and along the south side of Clifford Glacier, in Palmer Land, Antarctica. It was mapped by the United States Geological Survey in 1974, and was named by the Advisory Committee on Antarctic Names for Captain Hugh A. Kelley, U.S. Navy, Commander of Antarctic Support Activities during Operation Deep Freeze 1968 and 1969.

See also
Reynolds Bench

References

Mountains of Palmer Land